This is a list of high school athletic conferences in the Southwest Region of Ohio, as defined by the OHSAA. Because the names of localities and their corresponding high schools do not always match and because there is often a possibility of ambiguity with respect to either the name of a locality or the name of a high school, the following table gives both in every case, with the locality name first, in plain type, and the high school name second in boldface type. The school's team nickname is given last.

Central Buckeye Conference

Kenton Trail Division
 Bellefontaine Chieftains (1974-)
 Plain City Jonathan Alder Pioneers (2017-)
 Springfield Kenton Ridge Cougars (1977-)
 London Red Raiders (2017-)
 Springfield Shawnee Braves (1974-)
 New Carlisle Tecumseh Arrows (1991-)

Mad River Division
 Bellefontaine Benjamin Logan Raiders (2001-)
 St. Paris Graham Falcons (2001-)
 Lewistown Indian Lake Lakers (2001-)
 Richwood North Union Wildcats (2017-)
 Springfield Northwestern Warriors (1982-)
 Urbana Hillclimbers (1974-)

Former members
 Springfield Greenon Knights (1974-2017, to Ohio Heritage Conference)
 London Red Raiders (1974–78, to Central Buckeye League)
 Springfield Northeastern Jets (1974-2001, to Ohio Heritage Conference)
 Casstown Miami East Vikings (2001–06, to Cross County Conference)
 Riverside Stebbins Indians (2007-2016, to Greater Western Ohio)
 Tipp City Tippecanoe Red Devils (2001-2016, to Greater Western Ohio)

Cincinnati Hills League

 Cincinnati Deer Park Wildcats (1985-)
 Cincinnati Finneytown Wildcats (1985-)
 Cincinnati Indian Hill Braves (1985-)
 Cincinnati Madeira Mustangs (1985-)
 Cincinnati Mariemont Warriors (1985-)
 Reading Blue Devils (1985-)
 North Bend Taylor Yellow Jackets (1989-)
 Cincinnati Wyoming Cowboys (1985-)

Former members
 Cincinnati Academy of Physical Education Crusaders (1985-1994, closed)
 Loveland Tigers (1985-1995, to Southern Buckeye Athletic Conference)

Cincinnati Metro Athletic Conference

Blue Division
 Cincinnati College Prep Lions (2019-) 
 Miamisburg Dayton Christian Warriors (Football Only, 2019-)
 Cincinnati Gamble Montessori Gators (2019-)
 Cincinnati Hillcrest Academy Rams (2019-)
 Cincinnati Oyler Madhatters (No Football, 2019-)
 Cincinnati River View East Academy Hawks (2019-)
 Cincinnati Creative & Performing Arts Raiders (No Football, 2019-)
 Cincinnati Spencer Wolfpack (No Football, 2021-)

Red Division
 Cincinnati Aiken Falcons (2007-)
 Cincinnati Hughes Center Big Red (2007-)
 Cincinnati Shroder Paideia Jaguars (2007-) (Blue Division for Football)
 Cincinnati Taft Senators (2007-)
 Cincinnati Western Hills Mustangs (2007-)
 Cincinnati Withrow Tigers (2020-)
 Cincinnati Woodward Bulldogs (2007-)

Dayton City League
Dayton high schools were part of the Southwest Ohio Public League from 2002 to 2007, and played football in the same conference beginning in 2015.

 Dayton Belmont Bison (1956-2002, 2007-)
 Dayton Dunbar Wolverines (1931-2002, 2007-)
 Dayton Thurgood Marshall Cougars (2007-)
 Dayton Meadowdale Lions (1961-2002, 2007-)
 Dayton Ponitz Career Technology Center Golden Panthers (2009-)
 Dayton Stivers School for the Arts Tigers (no football) (1908-1976, 1996-2002, 2007-)

Former members (all closed)
 Dayton Kiser Panthers (1908-1982)
 Dayton Steele Lions (1908-1940)
 Dayton Patterson Beavers (1922-2009)
 Dayton Roosevelt Roughriders (1923-1975)
 Dayton Colonel White Cougars (1929-2007)
 Dayton Fairview Bulldogs (1933-1982)
 Dayton Roth Falcons (1959-1982)
 Dayton Wilbur Wright Pilots (1940-1982)

Eastern Cincinnati Conference

The Eastern Cincinnati Conference comprises teams mostly from larger schools in eastern Hamilton County and nearby counties in Greater Cincinnati.

 Cincinnati Anderson Raptors (2012-)
 Kings Mills Kings Knights (2012-)
 Lebanon Warriors (2020-)
 Morrow Little Miami Panthers (2020-)
 Loveland Tigers (2012-)
 Milford Eagles (2012-)
 Cincinnati Turpin Spartans (2012-)
 Cincinnati Walnut Hills Eagles (2012-)
 Batavia West Clermont Wolves (2017-)
 Cincinnati Winton Woods Warriors (2020-)

Former Members
 Cincinnati Glen Este Trojans (2012-2017, consolidated into West Clermont)
 Cincinnati Withrow Tigers (2014–2020, to Cincinnati Metro Athletic Conference)

Greater Catholic League
The GCL was restructured in 2013, as the Girls' Greater Catholic League was merged into the conference. The GGCL co-ed schools would merge into the same divisions as their GCL counterparts, while the single-sex schools were placed into the South Division.

 (Co-Ed)
 Kettering Archbishop Alter Knights (1990–present)
 Dayton Carroll Patriots (2006–present)
 Dayton Chaminade-Julienne Eagles (1990–present)
 Middletown Bishop Fenwick Falcons (2006–present)
 Hamilton Stephen T. Badin Rams (1990–present)
 Cincinnati Archbishop McNicholas Rockets (1990–present)

South (Boys)
 Cincinnati Elder Panthers (1931–present)
 Cincinnati La Salle Lancers (1962–present)
 Cincinnati Archbishop Moeller Crusaders (1962–present)
 Cincinnati St. Xavier Bombers (1931–present)

South (Girls)
 Cincinnati Mercy McAuley Wolves (2018)
 Cincinnati Mount Notre Dame Cougars (formerly Mountaineers) (2013–present)
 Cincinnati Seton Saints (2013–present)
 Cincinnati St. Ursula Bulldogs (2013–present)
 Cincinnati Ursuline Academy Lions (formerly Hornets) (2013–present)

Former members
 Hamilton Catholic Rams (1949–1966)
 Cincinnati McAuley Mohawks (2013–2018, consolidated into Mercy McAuley)
 Cincinnati Mother of Mercy Bobcats (2013–2018, consolidated into Mercy McAuley)
 Newport Catholic (KY) Thoroughbreds (1949–1970)
 Cincinnati St. Rita Lions (1962–?)
 Cincinnati Our Lady of Angels (19??-1984)
 Cincinnati Purcell Marian Cavaliers (1931–2020, to Miami Valley Conference)
 St. Bernard Roger Bacon Spartans (1931–2020, to Miami Valley Conference)

Greater Miami Conference

 Cincinnati Colerain Cardinals (1997-)
 Fairfield Indians (1966-)
 Hamilton Big Blue (1980-)
 Liberty Township Lakota East Thunderhawks (1997-)
 West Chester Lakota West Firebirds (1997-)
 Mason Comets (2007-)
 Middletown Middies (1966-)
 Cincinnati Oak Hills Highlanders (2000-)
 Sharonville Princeton Vikings (1966-)
 Cincinnati [[Sycamore High School (Cincinnati, Ohio)|Sycamore]] Aviators (1989-)Former schools Hamilton Garfield Griffins (1966–80, consolidated into Hamilton)
 Miamisburg Vikings (1966–67)
 Hamilton Taft Tigers (1966–80, consolidated into Hamilton)
 West Chester Lakota Thunderbirds (1980–97, split into Lakota East & Lakota West)
 Lima Spartans (1980-2000, Independent)
 Milford Eagles (1989-2007, to Fort Ancient Valley Conference)

Greater Western Ohio Conference
The GWOC was formed in 2001 as a merger of the Western Ohio League and Greater Miami Valley Conference.

There were 2 divisions prior to the 2020-2021 season. In 2020-2021, the divisions were done away with.

 Beavercreek Beavers (2001-)
 Centerville Elks (2001-)
 Kettering Fairmont Firebirds (2001-)
 Miamisburg Vikings (2006-)
 Clayton Northmont Thunderbolts (2001-)
 Springboro Panthers (2006-)
 Springfield Wildcats (2008-)
 Huber Heights Wayne Warriors (2001-)

Divisional AlignmentsFormer Schools Vandalia Butler Aviators (2001-2019, to Miami Valley League)
 Greenville Green Wave (2001–2005, 2010-2019, to Miami Valley League)
 Piqua Indians (2001-2019, to Miami Valley League)
 Sidney Yellow Jackets (2001-2019, to Miami Valley League)
 Springfield North Panthers (2001–08, consolidated into Springfield)
 Springfield South Wildcats (2001–08, consolidated into Springfield)
 Troy Trojans (2001-2019, to Miami Valley League)
 Xenia Buccaneers (2001-2019, to Miami Valley League)
 Fairborn Skyhawks (2006-2019, to Miami Valley League)
 West Carrollton Pirates (2010-2019, to Miami Valley League)
 Riverside Stebbins Indians (2016-2019, to Miami Valley League)
 Tipp City Tippecanoe Red Devils (2016-2019, to Miami Valley League)
 Lebanon Warriors (2006–20, to Eastern Cincinnati Conference)
 Trotwood-Madison Rams (2001–20, Independent)

Independents
 Winchester Eastern Warriors (football only, Southern Hills member in other sports)
 Fort Loramie Redskins (football only)
 Georgetown G-Men (football only, Southern Buckeye in other sports)
 Trotwood-Madison Rams

Metro Buckeye Conference

 Miamisburg Dayton Christian Warriors (Cincinnati Metro Athletic Conference in football 2019–Present)
 Springfield Emmanuel Christian Academy Lions (no football, 2009-)
 Xenia Legacy Christian Academy Knights (no football, 1998-)
 Dayton Miami Valley School Rams (no football, 1999-)
 Franklin Middletown Christian Eagles (no football, 1998-)
 Yellow Springs Bulldogs (no football, 1998-)Former members Fairfield Cincinnati Christian Cougars (1998-2005, to Miami Valley Conference)
 Springboro Ridgeville Christian Lions (2000–07, school closed)
 Sidney Lehman Catholic Cavaliers (football only, left in 2012)
 Fort Loramie Redskins (football only, left in 2012)
 Troy Christian Eagles (all sports except football, 1999-2021, to Three Rivers Conference)
 Dayton Jefferson Township Broncos (1998-2009, 2017–2022)

Miami Valley ConferenceScarlet Division Cincinnati Cincinnati Hills Christian Academy Eagles (2003-)
 Cincinnati Clark Montessori Cougars (2004-) (Grey Division for Football)
 Cincinnati North College Hill Trojans (1984–87, 1992-)
 Norwood Indians (2017-)
 Cincinnati Purcell Marian Cavaliers (Football only 2019-2020, Full member 2021-)
 St. Bernard Roger Bacon Spartans (Football only, 2019-2020, Full member 2021-)
 Cincinnati Summit Country Day Silver Knights (1984-)Grey Division Hamilton Cincinnati Christian Cougars (no football, 2003-)
 Cincinnati Cincinnati Country Day Nighthawks (1984-)
 Lockland Panthers (1984-)
 Cincinnati Miami Valley Christian Academy Lions (2017-)
 Hamilton New Miami Vikings (1984-)
 Cincinnati Seven Hills Stingers (no football, 1984-)
 Cincinnati St. Bernard-Elmwood Place Titans (1984-)

 Football Divisions Scarlet DivisionCincinnati Hills Christian Academy
North College Hill
Norwood
Purcell Marian
Roger Bacon
Summit Country DayGray DivisionCincinnati Country Day
Clark Montessori 
Lockland
Miami Valley Christian Academy
New Miami
St. BernardFormer members Cincinnati College Prep Lions (Football only, 2017-2020)
 Cincinnati Landmark Christian Eagles (1984-2004, school closed)
 Batavia Bulldogs (1985–89)
 Miamisburg Dayton Christian Warriors (Football only, 2013-2018)

Miami Valley League
The Miami Valley League (MVL) began competition during the 1926–27 school year, when the MVL held its first league championship in track. Football and basketball began with the 1927–28 school year. The league operated through the 1974–75 school year, when the three long-time members of the league formed the Miami Central Conference with similar-sized schools. The Miami Valley League resumed competition during the 2019-2020 school year as part of a breakoff from the Greater Western Ohio Conference (GWOC )Miami DivisionVandalia Butler Aviators (2019-)
 Greenville Green Wave (1926–72, 2019-)
 Piqua Indians (1926–75, 2019-)
 Tipp City Tippecanoe Red Devils (1926–27, 2019-)
 Troy Trojans (1926–68, 2019-)Valley Division Fairborn Skyhawks (1954–64, 2019-)
 Sidney Yellow Jackets (1926–75, 2019-)
 Riverside Stebbins Indians (2019-)
 West Carrollton Pirates (2019-)
 Xenia Buccaneers (1926–64, 2019-)Former Schools Miamisburg Vikings (1926–66, to Greater Miami Conference, 1967–75, to Miami Central Conference)
 Dayton Fairview Bulldogs (1930–33, to Dayton City League)
 Kettering Fairmont West Dragons (1932–64, Fairmont before 1963, to Western Ohio League)
 Oakwood Lumberjacks (1948–53, to Southwestern Buckeye League)
 Lima Central Catholic T-Birds (1969–75)
 Bellefontaine Chieftains (1966–74, to Central Buckeye Conference)
 Urbana Hillclimbers (1966–74, to Central Buckeye Conference)
 Lima Shawnee Indians (1966–75)
 Springfield Catholic Central Fighting Irish (1970–75)

Ohio Heritage Conference

The Ohio Heritage Conference is an OHSAA athletic league whose members are located in the Ohio counties of Champaign, Clark, Madison, Greene and Union. The league was established in the fall of 2001North Division Milford Center Fairbanks Panthers (2016-) (Football in 2017)
 Mechanicsburg Indians (2001-)
 Springfield Northeastern Jets (2001-)
 North Lewisburg Triad Cardinals (2001-)
 West Jefferson Roughriders (2017-)
 West Liberty-Salem Tigers (2001-)South Division Springfield Catholic Central Fighting Irish (2001-)
 Cedarville Indians (2001-)
 Jamestown Greeneview Rams (2001-)
 Springfield Greenon Knights (2017-)
 London Madison-Plains Eagles (2016-) (Football in 2017)
 South Charleston Southeastern Trojans (2001-)

Shelby County Athletic League

 Anna Rockets (football member of the Midwest Athletic Conference, pre-1940-)
 Botkins Trojans (pre-1940-)
 Sidney Fairlawn Jets (1951-)
 Fort Loramie Redskins (football member of the Cross County Conference, pre-1940-)
 Houston Wildcats (pre-1940-)
 Jackson Center Tigers (pre-1940-)
 Russia Raiders (pre-1940-)Former members Plattsville Green Township Griffins (pre-1940-51, consolidated into Fairlawn)
 McCartysville Mustangs (pre-1940-49, consolidated into Anna)
 Pemberton Perry Township Panthers (pre-1940-51, consolidated into Fairlawn)

Southern Buckeye Athletic/Academic Conference
The conference was formed as the Clermont County League in 1919, and changed their name to the Southern Buckeye in 1987.American Division Batavia Bulldogs (1919–85, 1989-)
 Clarksville Clinton-Massie Falcons (2001–05, 2017–)
 Goshen Warriors (1928–86, 2005-)
 New Richmond Lions (1919–57, 1969-)
 Mount Orab Western Brown Broncos (1972-)
 Wilmington Hurricane (2017–)National Division Bethel-Tate Tigers (1919-)
 Blanchester Wildcats (1992–95, 2001-)
 Owensville Clermont Northeastern Rockets (Owensville before 1958, 1919-)
 Sabina East Clinton Astros (2001–12, 2017–)
 Fayetteville-Perry Rockets (football only, 2017–)
 Felicity-Franklin Cardinals (no football, 1919-)
 Georgetown G-Men/Lady G-men (no football, 1997-)
 Williamsburg Wildcats (1919-)Former Members Batavia Amelia Barons (1919–85, 2010-2017, consolidated into West Clermont)
 Loveland Tigers (1919–36, 1995–97, to Fort Ancient Valley Conference)
 Milford Eagles (1919–57)
 Moscow Bears (1928–1959, consolidated into New Richmond)
 Cincinnati Glen Este Trojans (1965–1967)
 Cincinnati North College Hill Trojans (1987–1992, to Miami Valley Conference)
 Norwood Indians (2012-2017, to Miami Valley Conference)
 Hillsboro Indians (1993-2003, to South Central Ohio League)
 Greenfield McClain Tigers (2001–2003, to South Central Ohio League)

Southwest Ohio Conference

 Trenton Edgewood Cougars (2012-2023)
 Harrison Wildcats (2012-)
 Cincinnati Mount Healthy Fighting Owls (2012-)
 Cincinnati Northwest Knights (2012-)
 Hamilton Ross Rams (2012-2023)
 Oxford Talawanda Braves (2012-)Former members Morrow Little Miami Panthers (2012–2020, to Eastern Cincinnati Conference)
 Wilmington Hurricanes (2012–2014, to South Central Ohio League)

Southwestern Buckeye League

Southwestern Division (Bigger Schools)
 Bellbrook Golden Eagles (1975-)
 Franklin Wildcats (2006-)
 Monroe Lemon-Monroe Hornets (2006-)
 Dayton Oakwood Lumberjacks (1953-)Waynesville Spartans (2001-)

Buckeye Division (Small schools)
 Brookville Blue Devils (1959-)
 Carlisle Indians (1975-)
 Eaton Eagles (1941–42, 1946–72, 1982-)
 Middletown Madison Mohawks (1984-)
 Germantown Valley View Spartans (1975-)Former Members Bradford Railroaders (1941–42)
 Vandalia Butler Aviators (1941–45, 1951–75)
 New Lebanon Dixie Greyhounds (1975-2021, to Western Ohio Athletic Conference)
 West Milton Milton-Union Bulldogs (1941–82, 2001-2021, to Three Rivers Conference)
 Northridge Polar Bears (1959-2021, to Three Rivers Conference)
 Camden Preble-Shawnee Arrows (1984-2021, to Western Ohio Athletic Conference)
 Tipp City Tippecanoe Red Devils (1941–82)
 Versailles Tigers (1941–51)
 Trotwood Trotwood-Madison Rams (1942–43, 1951–75)
 West Carrollton Pirates (1946–75)
 Englewood Randolph Township Bobcats (1954–59, consolidated into Northmont)
 Clayton Northmont Thunderbolts (1959–75)
 Greenville Green Waves (1972–82)

Three Rivers Conference
This conference was formed in 2021 by members of the Cross-County Conference, Metro Buckeye Conference, Northwest Central Conference, and Southwestern Buckeye League.

 Tipp City Bethel Bees (2021-, from CCC)
 Covington Buccaneers (2021-, from CCC)
 Sidney Lehman Catholic Cavaliers (2021-, from NWCC)
 Casstown Miami East Vikings (2021-, from CCC)
 West Milton Milton-Union Bulldogs (2021-, from SWBL)
 Northridge Polar Bears (2021-, from SWBL)
 DeGraff Riverside Pirates (2021-, from NWCC)
 Troy Christian Eagles (2021-, from MBC)

Western Ohio Athletic Conference
This conference was formed in 2021 by ten schools from the Cross-County Conference being joined by two schools from the Southwestern Buckeye League.
 
 Ansonia Tigers (2021-)
 Arcanum Trojans (2021-)
 Bradford Railroaders (2021-)
 New Lebanon Dixie Greyhounds (2021-)
 Pitsburg Franklin Monroe Jets (no football) (2021-)
 Union City Mississinawa Valley Blackhawks (2021-)
 New Paris National Trail Blazers (2021-)
 Pleasant Hill Newton Indians (no football) (2021-)
 Camden Preble-Shawnee Arrows (2021-)
 Lewisburg Tri-County North Panthers (2021-)
 New Madison Tri-Village Patriots (2021-)
 West Alexandria Twin Valley South''' Panthers (2021-)

Defunct conferences

See also
Ohio High School Athletic Association

Notes and references